Agil Mammadov may refer to:

 Agil Mammadov (footballer, born 1972)
 Agil Mammadov (footballer, born 1989)
 Agil Mammadov (soldier)